James Ward was the defending champion, but decided not to participate.  Igor Sijsling won the title, defeating Sergei Bubka 6–1, 7–5 in the final.

Seeds

Draw

Finals

Top half

Bottom half

References
 Main Draw
 Qualifying Draw

Odlum Brown Vancouver Open
Vancouver Open